Jonathan Wayne "JJ" Lawhorn (born September 1993) in Hanover County, Virginia) is an American country music singer-songwriter. Lawhorn was discovered online by producer Jeremy Stover in 2010. He signed with EMI Music Publishing within a year. He signed a recording contract with Average Joes Entertainment, a record label owned by Colt Ford, in June 2011 when he was 17 years old.

Lawhorn's debut album, Original Good Ol' Boy, was released by Average Joes on July 16, 2013. The album was produced by Stover. Lawhorn wrote or co-wrote all thirteen tracks. Matt Bjorke of Roughstock gave the album four stars out of five, calling Lawhorn "an artist well worth seeking out." The album sold 4,000 copies in its first week of release, debuting at number 20 on the Billboard Top Country Albums chart and number 91 on the Billboard 200.

The single "Good Ol' Boys Like Us" was released to country radio on February 17, 2014. The song received a favorable review from Taste of Country, which called it "a great lyric and a strong vocal performance."

Personal life
Lawhorn graduated from Hanover High School in Mechanicsville, Virginia.

Discography

Albums

Singles

Guest singles

Music videos

References

External links

American country singer-songwriters
American male singer-songwriters
Country musicians from Virginia
Living people
People from Hanover County, Virginia
Singer-songwriters from Virginia
1993 births
21st-century American singers
21st-century American male singers
Average Joes Entertainment artists